Yousef Saad (born 1950) is an I.T. Distinguished Professor of Computer Science in the Department of Computer Science and Engineering at the University of Minnesota. He holds the William Norris Chair for Large-Scale Computing since January 2006. He is known for his contributions to the matrix computations, including the iterative methods for solving large sparse linear algebraic systems, eigenvalue problems, and parallel computing. He is listed as an ISI highly cited researcher in mathematics, is the most cited author in the journal Numerical Linear Algebra with Applications, and is the author of the highly cited book Iterative Methods for Sparse Linear Systems. He is a SIAM fellow (class of 2010) and a fellow of the AAAS (2011).

Education and career
Saad received his B.S. degree in mathematics from the University of Algiers, Algeria in 1970. He then joined University of Grenoble for the doctoral program and obtained a junior doctorate, 'Doctorat de troisieme cycle' in 1974 and a higher doctorate, 'Doctorat d’Etat' in 1983. During the course of his academic career he has held various positions, including Research Scientist in the Computer Science Department at Yale University (1981–1983), Associate Professor in the University of Tizi-Ouzou in Algeria (1983–1984), Research Scientist in the Computer Science Department at Yale University (1984–1986), and Associate Professor in the Mathematics Department at University of Illinois at Urbana-Champaign (1986–1988). He also worked as a Senior Scientist in the Research Institute for Advanced Computer Science (RIACS) during 1980–1990.

Saad joined University of Minnesota as a Professor in the Department of Computer Science in 1990. At Minnesota, he held the position of Head of the Department of Computer Science and Engineering between January 1997 and June 2000. Currently, he is the I. T. Distinguished Professor of Computer Science at University of Minnesota.

Books
Saad is the author of a couple of influential books in linear algebra and matrix computation which include
Numerical Methods for Large Eigenvalue Problems, Halstead Press, 1992.
Iterative Methods for Sparse Linear Systems, 2nd ed., Society for Industrial and Applied Mathematics, Philadelphia, 2003.

He has also co-edited the following article collections:

D. L. Boley, D. G. Truhlar, Y. Saad, R. E. Wyatt, and L. E. Collins, Practical Iterative Methods for Large Scale Computations. North Holland, Amsterdam, 1989.
D. E. Keyes, Y. Saad, and D. G. Truhlar, Domain-Based Parallelism and Problem Decomposition Methods in Computational Science and Engineering. SIAM, Philadelphia, 1995.
A. Ferreira, J. Rolim, Y. Saad, and T. Yang, Parallel Algorithms for Irregularly Structured Problems, Proceedings of Third International Workshop, IRREGULAR’96 Santa Barbara, CA USA, 1996. Lecture Notes in Computer Science, No 1117. Springer Verlag, 1996.
M. W. Berry, K. A. Gallivan, E. Gallopoulos, A. Grama, B. Philippe, Y. Saad, and F. Saied, High-Performance Scientific Computing: Algorithms and Applications. Springer, 2012.

References

External links

University of Minnesota faculty
Numerical analysts
Algerian mathematicians
Algerian computer scientists
20th-century American mathematicians
21st-century American mathematicians
University of Algiers alumni
Grenoble Alpes University alumni
Living people
Fellows of the Society for Industrial and Applied Mathematics
Computational chemists
1950 births
21st-century Algerian people